The International Ranger Federation is an organisation which represents Park Rangers and Park Wardens across the world.

Many countries have agencies that undertake the protection and management of natural areas. The rangers within these organisations are represented at the international level by the International Ranger Federation (IRF). The IRF seeks to represent Park Rangers on a professional level. A number of countries also have affiliated organisations with the same goals. Every 3 years the World Ranger Congress is held by a host country with the next one being in Chitwan, Nepal - 11 to 16 November 2019.

History
The International Ranger Federation (IRF) was founded in 1992 with a signed agreement between the Countryside Management Association (CMA), representing rangers in England and Wales; the Scottish Countryside Rangers Association (SCRA); and the U.S. Association of National Park Rangers (ANPR). The IRF is a non-profit organisation established to raise awareness of and support the critical work that Rangers do in conserving the world’s natural and cultural heritage. The role of the IRF is to empower Rangers by supporting their national or state Ranger organisations, or assisting in the establishment of local Ranger associations in countries where they do not currently exist. As of 2019 the IRF has over 100 associations of Rangers. There has been over 60 countries that have applied for one of three membership types - Regular, Provisional & Associate Membership.

Purpose
The goals of the IRF are to provide a forum for rangers from around the world to share their successes and failures in protecting the world's heritage and to promote information and technology transfer from countries in which protected area management enjoys broad public and government support to countries in which protected area management is less well supported.

Affiliated Organisations
The Australian Ranger Federation (ARF),
Associazione Italiana Guardie dei Parchi e delle Aree Protette (AIGAP), Association of National Park Rangers (ANPR)

External links
International Ranger Federation
AUSTRALIA - Australian Ranger Federation (ARF)
CANADA - National Park Warden Association
Park Wardens.com  Information about Canada's ecozones, the species found in each, and the projects and programs undertaken by Park Wardens to manage ecosystems and ensure public safety
CHILE - Cuerpo de Guardaparques de Chile
CZECH REPUBLIC - Association of Protected Areas Rangers of the Czech Republic
DENMARK Danish Ranger Association
ENGLAND and WALES - Countryside Management Association
FRANCE - Gardes Nature de France
ITALY - Associazione Ligure Agenti Di Vigilanza Ambientale
ITALY - Associazione Italiana Guardie dei Parchi e delle Aree Protete (AIGAP)
SCOTLAND - Scottish Countryside Rangers Association
SOUTH AFRICA - Game Rangers Association of Africa
UNITED STATES - Association of National Park Rangers (ANPR)
UNITED STATES - California State Park Rangers Association
SOUTH KOREA- Korean Rangers Association
SOUTH KOREA- Korea National Park Service : Official website for Korean National Parks. There are twenty units in three types of National Parks, mountain, coastal and marine, historic site.

Ecology organizations
Nature conservation organizations
International professional associations
Organizations established in 1992